One is a 2021 Indian Malayalam-language political drama film directed by Santhosh Vishwanath and written by Bobby & Sanjay. The film stars Mammootty in the lead role. Mathew Thomas, Murali Gopy, Siddique, Joju George, Ishaani Krishna, Gayatri Arun and Nimisha Sajayan plays the supporting roles. The film received positive reviews and above average in  box office and marks one of the best roles in Mammootty's career.

Premise

Kadakkal Chandran is the Chief Minister of Kerala and he undergoes a transformation and tries to do good to the populace by bringing Right to Recall (India) tool against corrupt ministers. Will he be able to politically, morally, and sensitively deal with the "plaguing accountability issue" within the existing circumstances becomes the plot.

Affected by the high handedness of police protecting the CM and the challenges faced by commoners when people of power are traveling, Sanal posts an angry anonymous Facebook post lamenting the situation, which goes viral. Opposition parties make this, into a major political issue leading up to a general strike. There is a serious hunt for Sanal by the government and police. The local MLA and attorney are afraid to take up his case.  He is apprehended as he tries to flee to Bengaluru. Later the CM declares that he wanted to meet Sanal in person. Though scared, he goes to the official residence of the Chief Minister. On meeting him, Sanal understands that the CM is a good leader and a wonderful human being after the CM reveals the truth behind Sanal's Facebook post. After initial friction, Sanal gets more close to the CM and they become close friends. The CM gives him an appointment and his life takes a new turn.

Cast

Production

Principal photography began in the month, October 2019.

Music
Gopi Sundar is the music director of the movie. The film has one song, "Janamanssin", a political anthem, sung by Shankar Mahadevan. Its lyrics were written by Rafeeq Ahamed.

Release

Theatrical
The film was originally scheduled to be released on 22 May 2020, but was postponed due to the COVID-19 pandemic. It was released on 26 March 2021.

Home media
Following the theatrical release, the film was released on 27 April 2021 on Netflix.

Reception

Critical response
The film received positive reviews from critics.

 Sify  gave it a rating of 4.5 stars out of 5 and wrote, " A relevant political drama ". Filmibeat  gave it a rating of 3 stars out of 5 and wrote, "Mammootty's extraordinary performance is the backbone of this moving political drama". Despite the minor flaws in storytelling, One emerges as a highly impactful theatrical experience. Indian Express  gave it a rating of 3.5 stars out of 5 and wrote, "Mammootty’s political drama is pleasant despite its problems". Times of India  gave it a rating of 3 stars out if 5 and wrote, "The portrait of a too-good-to-be-true CM ".Baradwaj Rangan of Film Companion South wrote "The film’s problem is in this utter predictability. The chief minister is so good, so pure and selfless that he becomes a big bore. It’s easier to portray Ravana on screen than Rama."

Box Office

This film grossed 12 cr at WW boxoffice against a budget of 7cr and ended up as an moderate success.

References

External links 
 

2021 films
2021 drama films
Indian political thriller films
Films shot in Thiruvananthapuram
Films shot in Kollam
Fictional portrayals of the Kerala Police
Films scored by Gopi Sundar